India competed at the 2016 Summer Olympics in Rio de Janeiro, Brazil, from 5 to 21 August 2016. Indian athletes have appeared in every edition of the Summer Olympics since 1920, although they made their official debut at the 1900 Summer Olympics in Paris.

117 Indian athletes participated in Rio 2016, 63 men and 54 women, across 15 sports at the Games. It was one of the nation's largest ever delegations sent to the Olympics, due to the historic comeback of the women's field hockey squad after 36 years and the proliferation of track and field athletes making the cut. Among the sporting events represented by its athletes, India made its Olympic debut in golf (new to the 2016 Games) and women's artistic gymnastics.

The Indian roster featured three Olympic medalists from London, including badminton star Saina Nehwal, freestyle wrestler and four-time Olympian Yogeshwar Dutt, and rifle shooter Gagan Narang. Tennis ace and 1996 bronze medalist Leander Paes topped the roster lineup by competing at his record seventh Olympics, while air rifle marksman Abhinav Bindra, who became the nation's first and only individual gold medalist in history (2008), led the Indian delegation as the flag bearer in the opening ceremony at his fifth consecutive Games. Other notable Indian athletes also included tennis player Sania Mirza in the women's doubles, artistic gymnast and Commonwealth Games bronze medalist Dipa Karmakar, and multiple-time world medalist Jitu Rai in men's pistol shooting.

India left Rio de Janeiro with two medals. These medals were won only by female athletes for the first time in history, a silver to badminton player P. V. Sindhu in the women's singles, who became India's youngest individual Olympic medallist and the first Indian woman to win an Olympic silver, as well as a bronze to freestyle wrestler Sakshi Malik in the women's 58 kg, who became the first female wrestler from India to win an Olympic medal. Several Indian athletes came close to increasing the medal haul, finishing in fourth place, including tennis tandem Mirza and Rohan Bopanna in the mixed doubles; Bindra, who narrowly missed out the podium by a half-point in the men's 10 m air rifle before retiring from the sport; and Karmakar, who surprised the global audience with her high-risk Produnova routine in the women's vault. For the first time, the Indian shooters failed to earn a single medal since 2004, and the boxers since 2008.

Medalists

Competitors

The following is the list of number of competitors participating in the Games. Note that reserves in fencing, field hockey, football, and handball are not counted as athletes:

Archery

Three Indian women's archers & One Indian men's archer qualified after having secured top eight finishes in the women's team recurve event & men's individual event at the 2015 World Archery Championships in Copenhagen, Denmark.

Athletics

Indian athletes have been able to achieve qualifying standard in the following athletic events (up to maximum of 3 athletes in each event) 

Indian shot putter Inderjeet Singh and 200 metres sprinter Dharambir Singh were suspended from participating in the Olympics after having failed both of the administered doping tests.

Track & road events
Men

* Reserves in the relay team.

Women

* Reserves in the relay team.

Field events

Badminton

Seven badminton players from India qualified for the Olympics for each of the following events based on their BWF World Rankings as of 5 May 2016:

Men

Women

Boxing

India has entered three boxers to compete in each of the following classes into the Olympic boxing tournament. London 2012 Olympian Shiva Thapa had claimed his Olympic spot with a semifinal victory at the 2016 Asia & Oceania Qualification Tournament in Qian'an, China, while Manoj Kumar and Vikas Krishan Yadav secured additional places on the Indian roster with their quarterfinal triumphs at the 2016 AIBA World Qualifying Tournament in Baku, Azerbaijan.

Field hockey

Summary

Men's tournament

India men's field hockey team qualified for the Olympics by receiving a berth and earning the gold medal from the 2014 Asian Games in Incheon.

Team roster

Group play

Quarterfinal

Women's tournament

India women's field hockey team qualified for the Olympics by having achieved a top five finish at the 2014–15 Women's FIH Hockey World League Semifinals, signifying its historic Olympic comeback after 36 years.

Team roster

Group play

Golf 

India has entered three golfers into the Olympic. Anirban Lahiri (Rank 62), Shiv Chawrasia (Rank 207), and Aditi Ashok (Rank 444) qualified directly among top 60 players for their respective individual events based on IGF World Rankings as of 11 July 2016.

Gymnastics

Artistic
India has qualified one artistic gymnast into the Olympic competition for the first time since 1964. Dipa Karmakar became the first Indian female ever to book an Olympic spot in the apparatus (vault, balance beam, uneven bars and floor exercise) events and all-around event at the Olympic Test Event in Rio de Janeiro.

Women

Judo

India has qualified one judoka for men's middleweight category (90 kg) for the olympic. Avtar Singh earned a continental quota from the Asian region, as the highest-ranked Indian judoka outside of direct qualifying position in the IJF World Ranking List of 30 May 2016.

Rowing

India has qualified one boat in the men's single sculls for the Olympics at the 2016 Asia & Oceania Continental Qualification Regatta in Chungju, South Korea.

Qualification Legend: FA=Final A (medal); FB=Final B (non-medal); FC=Final C (non-medal); FD=Final D (non-medal); FE=Final E (non-medal); FF=Final F (non-medal); SA/B=Semifinals A/B; SC/D=Semifinals C/D; SE/F=Semifinals E/F; QF=Quarterfinals; R=Repechage

Shooting

Indian shooters have achieved quota places for the following events by virtue of their best finish at the 2014 and 2015 ISSF World Championships, the 2015 ISSF World Cup series and Asian Championships, as long as they obtained a minimum qualifying score (MQS) by 31 March 2016.

On 19 March 2016, National Rifle Association of India (NRAI) had announced the squad of eleven Indian shooters for the Games, featuring four-time Olympian and Beijing 2008 air rifle champion Abhinav Bindra, London 2012 bronze medalist Gagan Narang, and multiple-time Worlds medalist Jitu Rai. Aiming to appear at his fourth Olympics, Manavjit Singh Sandhu became the twelfth Indian to join the team, as the NRAI decided to exchange a spot in the 50 m rifle 3 positions (won by Sanjeev Rajput) with the men's trap.

Men

Women

Qualification Legend: Q = Qualify for the next round; q = Qualify for the bronze medal (shotgun)

Swimming

India has received a Universality invitation from FINA to send two swimmers (one male and one female) to the Olympics.

Table tennis

India has entered four athletes into the table tennis competition at the Games. 2012 Olympian Soumyajit Ghosh and Manika Batra secured the Olympic spot each in the men's and women's singles as the highest-ranked player coming from the South Asia zone, while Sharath Kamal and 2004 Olympian Mouma Das scored a second-stage draw victory each to take the remaining spots on the Indian team at the Asian Qualification Tournament in Hong Kong.

Tennis

India has entered four tennis players into the Olympic tournament. Sania Mirza (world no. 1) and Rohan Bopanna (world no. 10) teamed up with their partners Prarthana Thombare and six-time Olympian Leander Paes, respectively, in the men's and women's doubles by virtue of their top-10 ATP and WTA Ranking as of 6 June 2016.

Weightlifting

India has qualified one male and one female weightlifter for the Rio Olympics by virtue of a top seven national finish (for men) & top six (for women), respectively, at the 2016 Asian Championships.

Wrestling

India has qualified eight wrestlers for each of the following weight category into the Olympic. One Olympic spot in the men's freestyle 74 kg was earned at the 2015 World Championships, while two more Olympic places were awarded to Indian wrestlers, who progressed to the top two finals at the 2016 Asian Qualification Tournament.

Three further wrestlers had claimed the remaining Olympic slots in separate World Qualification Tournaments; one of them in men's freestyle 57 kg at the initial meet in Ulaanbaatar, and two more each in women's freestyle 48 & 58 kg at the final meet in Istanbul.

On 11 May 2016, United World Wrestling awarded two additional Olympic licenses to India in men's Greco-Roman 85 kg and women's freestyle 53 kg, after doping violations were discovered among the seven qualified wrestlers

Freestyle wrestler Narsingh Pancham Yadav, who had qualified for the men's 74 kg event, failed both the A and B sample doping tests on 25 June and 5 July. He was provisionally replaced by Parveen Rana, but was later reinstated on 3 August when the National Anti-Doping Agency of India gave him a clean record on grounds that he had been a victim of sabotage. However the World Anti-Doping Agency appealed against this decision to drop the doping charges, following which Yadav was suspended for four years and disqualified from the Olympics by the Court of Arbitration on 18 August.

Men's freestyle

Men's Greco-Roman

Women's freestyle

See also
 India at the 2016 Summer Paralympics
 2016 Summer Olympics medal table
India at the Olympics

References

External links 

 

Olympics
2016
Nations at the 2016 Summer Olympics